Pierre Méhaignerie (born 4 May 1939) is a French politician. He is a former deputy of the Ille-et-Vilaine's 5th constituency and the former mayor of Vitré (re-elected in March 2008).

He was elected in 1973 to the French parliament in the Ille-et-Vilaine's 3rd constituency and became mayor of Vitré in 1977. He was Minister of Agriculture from 1977 to 1981 and Minister of Justice from 1993 to 1995. A former member of the UDF political party, he was general secretary of the right-wing UMP from 2004 to 2007.

References

1939 births
Living people
People from Ille-et-Vilaine
Mayors of places in Brittany
Politicians of the French Fifth Republic
French Ministers of Justice
Transport ministers of France
French Ministers of Agriculture
Union for a Popular Movement politicians
Deputies of the 12th National Assembly of the French Fifth Republic
Deputies of the 13th National Assembly of the French Fifth Republic
Union of Democrats and Independents politicians
Vitré, Ille-et-Vilaine